Edward Hendricks (June 20, 1885 – November 28, 1930) was a pitcher in Major League Baseball. He played for the New York Giants in 1910.

References

External links

1885 births
1930 deaths
Major League Baseball pitchers
New York Giants (NL) players
Holland Wooden Shoes players
Baseball players from Mississippi